Alycus is a genus of mite, including the species Alycus roseus.

References

Trombidiformes genera